The St. Raphael Cathedral  also called Surat Thani Cathedral  is the mother church of the Roman Catholic Diocese of Surat Thani. It is located in the city of Surat Thani in the province of the same name in the south of the Southeast Asian country of Thailand.

The present church was built in 1962 and became a cathedral with the creation of the diocese of Surat Thani (Dioecesis Suratthanensis or สังฆมณฑลสุราษฎร์ธานี), which was established in 1969 with the Bull "Qui Regno Christi" of Pope Paul VI.

It is under the pastoral responsibility of the Bishop Joseph Prathan Sridarunsil.

See also
Roman Catholicism in Thailand
Assumption Cathedral, Bangkok

References

Roman Catholic cathedrals in Thailand
Buildings and structures in Surat Thani
Roman Catholic churches completed in 1962
20th-century Roman Catholic church buildings in Thailand